Ingledew is a surname. Notable people with the surname include:

George Ingledew (1903–1979), English footballer
Hugh Ingledew (1865–1937), Welsh rugby player